The Journal of Autoimmunity is a peer-reviewed medical journal covering research on all aspects of autoimmunity. It was established in 1988 and is published 8 times per year by Elsevier. The editors-in-chief are Yehuda Shoenfeld (Sheba Medical Center) and M. Eric Gershwin (University of California, Davis). According to the Journal Citation Reports, the journal has a 2021 impact factor of 14.551.

References

External links 
 

Publications established in 1988
Immunology journals
Elsevier academic journals
English-language journals
8 times per year journals